New Inside is the third studio album by Tiffany, which was released by MCA on October 2, 1990. Tiffany severed her ties with manager/producer George Tobin soon after her 18th birthday, and signed with manager Dick Scott and producer Maurice Starr, the latter responsible for forming the group New Kids on the Block (NKOTB). During Tiffany's U.S. tour in 1988, NKOTB were her opening act; a year later, the roles reversed when NKOTB's popularity eclipsed that of Tiffany. New Inside came out on Tiffany's 19th birthday, and she hoped it would revive her faltering career.

The album was not a commercial success in the United States, and neither the album nor any single released from it made it onto the pop charts, though the title track "New Inside" received a little bit of airplay in some areas and reached some local radio stations' request-based countdowns thanks to the efforts of fans, who were starting to get organized on bulletin board systems and online services. In Japan, the album was a Top 20 success, where it peaked at No. 17, and staying in the Top 100 for a total of six weeks.

An attempt was made to take advantage of current events by rededicating the song "Here in My Heart", written by superstar songwriter Diane Warren (who is responsible for many pop hits for other artists), to the troops serving in the Gulf War. Previously, the song had been dedicated to AIDS victim Ryan White.

Ultimately, Tiffany broke her ties with Scott and Starr, and returned to Tobin for her fourth album Dreams Never Die.

The CD booklet and back cover show "A Moment to Rest" as track number 3, but this brief instrumental interlude is actually on the CD as part of the following track, "Tenderly", shown as track 4 on the cover but actually track 3; all subsequent tracks are confusingly shown with numbers one higher than actually displayed by a CD player.

Background
After the release of her second album Hold an Old Friend's Hand in 1988, Tiffany decided to change musical direction towards an urban and contemporary R&B sound, and develop a new image. When manager and producer George Tobin disagreed with her desire to change musical direction, the singer looked for a new manager and selected the New Kids on the Block manager Dick Scott. Speaking of the album, she told the Chicago Tribune in 1990, "It's a completely different sound. I wanted to show I could do new things. I've always listened to R&B music, so I was delighted to do it on the new album. I had more input on this album than any other."

In a 2012 interview with The A.V. Club, Tiffany recalled her frustration with the corporate side of the music business and her desire to shake off the "pop star" image with New Inside at a time when her fans were growing up and music was changing, "I definitely wanted to write. I had changed management at that time, because I was saying, 'It's time to grow up. It's time to be a little more edgy. It's time to be a little bit more tuned-in. If we're going to do dance music, then let's really do dance music.' A lot of the people I was working with didn't want to do that, so I found a whole new camp."

Speaking of her experience recording the album, Tiffany added, "I was really thrilled that Donnie Wahlberg became a part of [the] project, and I worked with some great people. Phillip Damien was awesome. I think he vocally took me to a whole different level. A lot of my fans at first were like, 'Oh, I don't know if I like that tone of your voice, and you're hitting notes that I'm not used to, and it sounds a little screechy,' but as a vocalist, for me that was such an experience, because I tapped into things I didn't know I could do."

Critical reception

Upon its release, New Inside received mixed reviews from critics. On its release, Billboard felt Tiffany had "shrug[ged] off the dated sound" of her previous work with Tobin in favour of a "harder-edged, pop/funk pose" on New Inside. The reviewer considered the album to be made up of "formulaic material" but added that it has "several sterling moments". Jan DeKnock of the Chicago Tribune noted that New Inside contained "a much more contemporary sound, with plenty of pop-funk-dance winners" and described Tiffany's vocals as having a "new throaty snarl to go along with her powerful pipes". She criticized some tracks for having "too many layers of busy production" and highlighted "Here in My Heart" for having a "simple charm" and allowing Tiffany to show off her "strong, expressive voice to greater advantage".

Greg Sandow of Entertainment Weekly considered the album to shift Tiffany from pop to R&B, but felt the album was in need of "classier songs" and that the production left the album "without much personality". He noted, "The R&B she sings here is the mass-produced kind, electronic and unusually punchy. So yes, she now sounds tough and street smart; she can wail with a vocal strength she never demonstrated before. But the plaintive, even troubled undercurrent in her voice, which was the best thing about her teen pop, mostly gets buried under a barrage of synthesizer effects." In a retrospective review, Alex Henderson of AllMusic noted Tiffany's attempt to move away from "sugary pop" and "embrac[e] a tougher urban contemporary sound". However, he felt the album was unmemorable, commenting, "High-tech cuts like 'Tiff's Back' and the new jack swing-influenced 'It's You' sound like they were tailor-made for urban radio. They also sound contrived and robotic."

Track listing

Charts

References 

1990 albums
Tiffany Darwish albums
Albums produced by Maurice Starr
MCA Records albums
New jack swing albums